The International Racquetball Federation's 21st Racquetball World Championships were held in San Luis Potosi, Mexico from August 20-27, 2022. This was the first time Worlds was in Mexico since 2000, when it was also held in San Luis Potosi.

The 2022 World Championships used a best of five games match format with each game to 11 points, win by 2, with rally scoring, as used in other sports like squash and volleyball. Previously, racquetball games used side-out scoring, where players scored points only when they had won a rally which began with that player serving. Rallies won when not serving were simply side-outs: the rally losing player lost the serve and the rally winning player won the opportunity to serve, but did not win a point.

In 2022, Mexican Paola Longoria won Women's Singles for a record extending 5th time by defeating Guatemalan Gabriela Martinez in the final, 12-10, 11-7, 11-7. It was the 3rd time in the last four World Championships that Longoria and Martinez met in the Women's Singles final. They split the previous two times: Longoria winning in 2016 and Martinez in 2018.

Tournament format
The 2022 World Championships used a two-stage format to determine the World Champions. Initially, players competed in separate groups over three days. The results were used to seed players for the medal round with only the top two players from each group advancing to the medal round.

Women’s singles

Group stages
Group 1

Group 2

Group 3

Group 4

Group 5

Group 6

Medal round

References

External links
IRF website

Racquetball World Championships
Racquetball in Mexico
Racquetball competitions